The Page News and Courier is Page County, Virginia’s largest general circulation newspaper and provides coverage of local and regional news, events, issues, people, and industries. The newspaper was founded in Luray, Virginia in 1911, by a merger between The Page News (established in 1881) and The Page Valley Courier (established March 1867). The Page News and Courier is one of a number of newspapers owned by the Byrd Family. Other newspapers in the group include The Winchester Star (Winchester, Virginia and Frederick County, Virginia), The Daily News-Record (Harrisonburg, Virginia and Rockingham County, Virginia), The Warren Sentinel (Front Royal, Virginia and Warren County, Virginia), The Shenandoah Valley-Herald (Woodstock, Virginia and Shenandoah County, Virginia), The Valley Banner (Elkton, Virginia), The Clarke Times (Berryville, Virginia and Clarke County, Virginia), and the Rocktown Weekly (Harrisonburg, Virginia).

An earlier newspaper, the Luray Review, may have been the predecessor of Page Valley Courier, having been established before the American Civil War. Due to financial woes experienced on account of the war, however, the Luray Review may have ceased production as early as 1862.

On March 6, 2018, it was announced that The Page News and Courier, along with the other Byrd family newspapers, was sold to Ogden Newspapers.

Notes
 With a circulation of 8,000, the newspaper is viewed by nearly all households of the county weekly. 
 The paper is released on Wednesdays to news stands and sold on the corner of Main and Broad in Luray.  Those who subscribe to the paper via the United States Postal Service receive their copy on Thursday in the mail, hence the paper is printed, and dated, for Thursday distribution. 
 The price of the paper was raised to 75 cents in 2013.

References 

Newspapers published in Virginia
Newspapers established in 1911
Page County, Virginia
1911 establishments in Virginia